Huh Ki-Tae (born July 13, 1967) is a South Korean footballer.
He played for Yukong Elephants.

Honors and awards

Player
Yukong Elephants
 K-League Runners-up (1) : 1994
 League Cup Winners (2) : 1994, 1996

Individual
 K-League Best XI (3) : 1994, 1995, 1996

References

External links
 

1967 births
Living people
Association football defenders
South Korean footballers
Jeju United FC players
Suwon Samsung Bluewings players
K League 1 players
Korea University alumni